Rick Johnson is a Michigan politician who served in the House of Representatives for the 102nd District from 1999 to 2004, and as Speaker of the House from 2001 to 2004.

Born in LeRoy, Osceola County, Johnson was an honors graduate of Pine River High School. He served as an Osceola County commissioner for eight years from 1986 to 1994, including five as chairman of the board, and on the Pine River School Board for six years from 1980 to 1986. Johnson was vice chairman of the Region VII Planning Commission and the District VII director of the Michigan Farm Bureau, serving as a state board member from 1994 to 1998. He was also owner and operator of the family dairy and tree farm, on the board of the Rose Lake Youth Camp, and is active in the Osceola County Community Foundation. As a former state House speaker, Johnson is a permanent member of the National Speakers Conference Executive Committee.

He is a partner in the firm Dodak Johnson with fellow former Speaker Lew Dodak.

In 2015, Johnson signed an amicus brief asking the United States Supreme Court to make same-sex marriage legal nationwide.

References

County commissioners in Michigan
Living people
Year of birth missing (living people)
People from Osceola County, Michigan
Speakers of the Michigan House of Representatives
Republican Party members of the Michigan House of Representatives
20th-century American politicians
21st-century American politicians